Dublin Cabra was a parliamentary constituency represented in Dáil Éireann, the lower house of the Irish parliament or Oireachtas from 1977 to 1981. The constituency elected 3 deputies (Teachtaí Dála, commonly known as TDs) to the Dáil, using proportional representation by means of the single transferable vote (PR-STV).

History
The constituency was created in 1977, under the Electoral (Amendment) Act 1974, taking in parts of the former Dublin North-West and Dublin Central constituencies, as part of the redistribution of constituencies which attempted to secure the re-election of the outgoing Fine Gael–Labour Party government. The constituency was abolished in 1981 with most of it going into a revived Dublin Central constituency. There were 16 electoral areas in Dublin Cabra; 13 went to Dublin Central for the 1981 election, with three going to the new Dublin West (the areas of Phoenix Park, Cabra West A and Cabra West C).

Boundaries
It covered the Cabra, Arran Quay and Phoenix Park areas of Dublin city.

TDs

1977 general election

See also 
Dáil constituencies
Politics of the Republic of Ireland
Historic Dáil constituencies
Elections in the Republic of Ireland

References

External links 
Oireachtas Members Database

Dáil constituencies in County Dublin (historic)
1977 establishments in Ireland
1981 disestablishments in Ireland
Constituencies established in 1977
Constituencies disestablished in 1981